High Willhays, or according to some authorities High Willes, is the highest point on Dartmoor, Devon, at  above sea level, and the highest point in Southern England.

Toponymy
In 1912, William Crossing, writer and documenter, said that the name High Willes had been thought to have derived from the word huel or wheal meaning mine, but he did not think that very likely as old mine workings were invariably located near to streams. He suggested instead that the name derived from gwylfa, a watching place, noting its similarity with Brown Willy, the name of the highest hill on nearby Bodmin Moor, and suggested that a watch for beacon fires used to be kept here. He also posited a possible link to the word gwili meaning winding or tortuous, but said it was unlikely this was where it originated from.

The Place-Names of Devon (1931) notes that the peak was named Hight Wyll in a document of 1532, and was known in 1827 as High Willows. The authors state that the name may simply be a compound of high and well (meaning spring), though they admit that the additional syllable at the end is hard to explain.

Topography
Although it is the highest point of the moor, it is relatively insignificant in comparison to most of the moor's tors, consisting of no more than a few low outcrops of rock along a north–south ridge. The largest outcrop is crowned with a cairn.

High Willhays and Yes Tor are the only summits in England south of Kinder Scout in the Peak District to rise above , apart from Black Mountain on the Welsh border. Before Ordnance Survey measured accurately the heights of High Willhays and Yes Tor many people believed Yes Tor was the higher of the two, and it was only the local farmers and moormen that believed the contrary.  However, the first topographical survey of the area carried out by Ordnance Survey suggested that High Willhays was  higher, although the difference has now been measured at just . William Crossing stated that High Willhays was the highest point in England south of Ingleborough in the Yorkshire Dales, but since then surveys have shown that Kinder Scout is also higher (albeit less prominent).

The geology of High Willhays, like most of Dartmoor, consists of granite intruded about 280 million years ago. However High Willhays is in an area of the northern plateau of the moor where the exposed rock has noticeably fewer of the large feldspar megacrysts that are typical of most of Dartmoor's tors. Each of the outcrops displays lamellar bedding.

High Willhays is within one of Dartmoor's Danger Zones, areas used periodically by the British Army for exercises. Red flags are raised around the perimeter when live-firing is due to take place.

References

External links
 Computer generated summit panorama High Willhays

Tors of Dartmoor
Marilyns of England
Hewitts of England
Hills of Devon
Nuttalls
Highest points of English counties
Dartmoor